Edward J. Ballard (about 1790 – 1 June 1813) was an officer in the United States Navy during the War of 1812.

Ballard was appointed a midshipman on 24 February 1809. His commission as a lieutenant was issued before news of the battle reached the Navy Department.

Namesake
Two ships have been named  for him.

See also

References
 

1790 births
1813 deaths
United States Navy officers
American military personnel killed in the War of 1812
United States Navy personnel of the War of 1812